The 2014 NRL season consisted of 26 weekly regular season rounds starting on Thursday March 6, and concluded on Sunday October 5 with the grand final, where the South Sydney Rabbitohs ended a 43-year premiership drought by defeating the Canterbury-Bankstown Bulldogs 30–6.

Regular season

Round 1

The Melbourne Storm won their season opener for the 10th successive year.

Round 2

Round 3

Round 4

Round 5

Round 6

Round 7

 The Bulldogs became the first team in History to win 3 straight games by 1 point.

Round 8

Round 9

 The Raiders became the first team since North Queensland in Rounds 13 and 14 2007 to concede 50+  points in consecutive games, it was also the 2nd time in Raiders History this had happened, having happened in Rounds 2 and 3 2006.

Round 10

Round 11

 South Sydney held an opposition team to nil for the first time since Round 18 1999, and the first time since re-admission in 2002.

Round 12

Round 13

Round 14

Round 15

 Cronulla became the first team in history to be held to nil 3 games in a row.

Round 16

 Cronulla completed the biggest comeback in their history, coming back from 22-0 down to overwhelm the Broncos 24–22, the record would stand for just 8 days.

Round 17

 Cronulla again successfully completed their biggest comeback, this time trailing the Roosters 24-0 before coming back to win 30–28, it is regarded as one of the biggest upset in NRL history.

Round 18

 The Bulldogs won in Melbourne for the first time since Round 11 2005, it was also their lowest winning score since 1993.

Round 19

Round 20

Round 21

 The Warriors won their first game in Canberra since 2001, and first time at GIO Stadium since 1997, it was also the 7th instance of a team putting 50+ on the same opposition twice in a season, it was also the first time a team has scored 50+ against a team 3 games in a row.

Round 22

The North Queensland Cowboys set a new club record for largest winning margin in their 64–6 victory over Wests 
Tigers.

The Newcastle Knights defeated the Melbourne Storm with a dramatic ending. 30–20 to the Storm at 77mins until the Knights came back at took a 32-30 point win.

Round 23

 St George Illawarra's win was their first in Canberra since July 2000

Round 24

Round 25

The Warriors' 42–0 win over the Gold Coast was the first time the Titans had been kept scoreless.

Round 26

Finals series

Qualifying and Elimination Finals
1st Qualifying Final

2nd Qualifying Final

1st Elimination Final

2nd Elimination Final

Semi finals
1st Semi Final

2nd Semi Final

Preliminary Finals
2014 saw the first time since the NRL's formation in 1998 that the last four remaining teams were all from Sydney.

1st Preliminary Final

2nd Preliminary Final

Grand final

References

National Rugby League season results
Results